The Barnawapara Wildlife Sanctuary is located in  Mahasamund district. The reserve is about 100 km from Raipur and about 45 km from Mahasamund city. It was established in 1976 under the Wildlife Protection Act. The Jonk River flows through the sanctuary, which is a tributary of the Mahanadi river. The sanctuary lies 25 km to the east of Sirpur, Mahasamund which is known for its monuments, collectively known as Sirpur Group of Monuments

Name
The Barnawapara Wildlife Sanctuary is named after the twin forest villages of Bar and Nawapara located in the sanctuary.

Area and terrain
The sanctuary is spread over an area of about 245 square km. The Jonk River, a tributary of the Mahanadi river, flows through the sanctuary, and is bisected by a number other of streams and rivulets, besides numerous watering holes. The tributaries of Mahanadi are the source of water here. Balamdehi River forms the western boundary and Jonk River forms the north-eastern boundary of the Sanctuary. It is a land mass of undulating terrain dotted with numerous low and high hillocks.

Flora
The sanctuary is full with Tropical Dry Deciduous Forests and Bamboo is amongst the most commonly spotted tree here. Sal, Mahua, Semal, Tendu Ber, Teak and other tropical dry deciduous trees like Tendu, Terminalia, Mahua, Ber and Semal trees are also commonly found in the reserve.

Fauna
Wildlife of the sanctuary include Tigers, Sloth Bear, Flying Squirrels, Jackals, Four-horned Antelopes, Leopards, Chinkara, Black Buck, Jungle Cat, Barking Deer, Porcupine, Monkey, Bison, Striped Hyena, Wild Dogs, Chital, Sambar, Nilgai, Jackal, Gaur, Muntjac, Wild Boar, Cobra, and Python. Recently wild buffalo were imported from Manas National Park for reintroduction in the wild.  The sanctuary also has a large population of birds that include Peacock, Parrots, Bulbul, White-rumped Vultures, Green Avadavat, Lesser Kestrels, Peafowl, Wood Peckers, Racket-tailed Drongos, Egrets, and Herons. Bird watching in Barnawapara is one of the most enjoyed and popular activities.

Connectivity
The reserve is about 100 km from Raipur and about 45 km from Mahasamund city. The nearest airport is the Swami Vivekananda Airport.

Tourism
There are a number of scenic waterfalls in the sanctuary, like Dhaskund waterfall, Siddhakhol Waterfall, Nakuti Darha waterfall, etc. There are other tourist attractions, such as Gond Nagarjuna caves, which the local Gondi people consider as sacred and have been worshipping there. The Gonds call it 'Chanda Dai'. Once the Dalai Lama had come to meditate in this cave. Other places like Turturiya Dham are also popular. It is situated on the northern boundary of the sanctuary besides the Balamdehi river, 13 km from Barnawapara, is believed to have been the abode of Sage Valmiki and the place where Sita lived in exile, and where Luv and Kush were born.

References

Wildlife sanctuaries in Chhattisgarh
Mahasamund district
1976 establishments in Madhya Pradesh
Protected areas established in 1976